The Marion Correctional Institution (MCI) is a minimum- and medium-security prison for men located in Marion, Marion County, Ohio, owned and operated by the Ohio Department of Rehabilitation and Correction.

The facility first opened in 1954 and has a working population of 2,623 state inmates.  The facility is close to the North Central Correctional Complex, a private prison also housing Ohio state inmates.

In 2015, two prisoners built two PCs with parts that were used to do malicious actions on the prison's secure network.

On April 18, 2020, approximately 50 National Guardsmen were activated to assist staff after nearly two thousand prisoners and staff tested positive for the 2019-nCoV coronavirus. One correction officer had died by that point, and nearly three-quarters of prisoners had tested positive.

In May 2020 Jay Z and rapper Meek Mill, through their group REFORM Aliiance, donated 10 million protective masks to correctional systems throughout the United States, including MCI.

As of July 28, 2020, 2 inmates had died 1,224 inmates were placed in medical quarantine, and another 11 were placed in security quarantine.

Notable inmates
Bobby Lee Cutts Jr.
Kevin Keith
Don King (boxing promoter) (1967—1970s)

References

Prisons in Ohio
Buildings and structures in Marion, Ohio
1954 establishments in Ohio